Panteleyevo may refer to several rural localities in Russia:

Panteleyevo, Kolchuginsky District, Vladimir Oblast, village in Razdolyevskoye Rural Settlement, Kolchuginsky District, Vladimir Oblast
Panteleyevo, Kovrovsky District, Vladimir Oblast, selo in Klyazminskoye Rural Settlement, Kovrovsky District, Vladimir Oblast
Panteleyevo, Nikolsky District, Vologda Oblast, village in Vakhnevskoye Rural Settlement, Nikolsky District, Vologda Oblast
Panteleyevo, Vologodsky District, Vologda Oblast, village in Mayskoye Rural Settlement, Vologodsky District, Vologda Oblast